Élisabeth Marquet (born 20 November 1960) is a French politician who was Member of Parliament for Seine-et-Marne's 6th constituency for a day in 2020.

She is Mayor of Jarzé-Villages, and therefore had to resign her seat due to the dual mandate.

References 

Living people
1960 births
Deputies of the 15th National Assembly of the French Fifth Republic
Women mayors of places in France
21st-century French women politicians
The Republicans (France) politicians
French farmers
French women farmers
Women members of the National Assembly (France)
21st-century farmers
20th-century farmers